The 2001–02 The Citadel Bulldogs basketball team represented The Citadel, The Military College of South Carolina in the 2001–02 NCAA Division I men's basketball season. The Bulldogs were led by fifth head coach Pat Dennis and played their home games at McAlister Field House. They were a member of the South Division of the Southern Conference.

Roster

Schedule

|-
|colspan=7 align=center|2002 Southern Conference men's basketball tournament

References

The Citadel Bulldogs basketball seasons
Citadel
The Citadel Bulldogs bask
The Citadel Bulldogs bask